Camperdown railway station is located on the Warrnambool line in Victoria, Australia. It serves the town of Camperdown, and opened on 2 July 1883.

History
When Camperdown station opened, it was the terminus of the line from Colac. On 23 April 1887, the line was extended to Terang.

The station was once the junction for the Timboon line, which branched off at the western or  down end of the station. All signalling and safeworking equipment at the junction had been abolished by September 1987.

By May 1969, the former turntable at the station was removed, and in March 1976, the refreshment room closed. Passenger facilities were refurbished in late 1984 and early 1985. It was also in 1985 that the former freight centre closed, and the freight office had been demolished by August of that year.

In September 1988, the former No. 2 and No. 4 roads were abolished, as were the sidings provided for Shell and Mobil, and the locomotive and works sidings. A number of signal posts were also removed, along with a ground lever frame. In 1991, No. 3 road was abolished.

The Warrnambool freight train crosses the weekday morning up passenger train to Southern Cross station in Melbourne, at the remaining crossing loop on the line. However, with services scheduled to increase to five per weekday from 2022, as part of the Regional Rail Revival project, and the construction of a crossing loop at Boorcan, between Camperdown and Terang stations, its possible that the crossing loop at Camperdown (No. 2 road) will be decommissioned.

Platforms and services
Camperdown has one platform. It is served by V/Line Warrnambool line trains. The station building comprises a waiting room, a ticket and customer service desk, and toilets.

Platform 1:
 services to Warrnambool and Southern Cross

References

External links
Victorian Railway Stations gallery

Railway stations in Australia opened in 1883
Regional railway stations in Victoria (Australia)
Camperdown, Victoria